Donna Mercado Kim is an American Democratic party politician from Hawaii. She is a state senator from Senate District 14 and was President of the Hawaiʻi Senate for almost three years.

Education
Kim attended, and graduated from Farrington High School, in Kalihi-Palama, Honolulu.
Kim is a graduate of Washington State University, although she also attended the University of Hawaiʻi at Mānoa.

Political career
From 1982 to 1984, Kim was a member of the Hawaiʻi House of Representatives.

From 1986 to 2000, Kim served on the Honolulu City Council.

Elected to the Senate in 2000, Kim has chaired the Committee on Tourism, the Committee on Ways and Means, the Special Committee on Accountability, and the Task Force on Reinventing Government.

From 2003 to 2008 and again from 2011 to 2013, Kim served as Vice President of the Senate.

In 2013, Kim became President of the Hawaiʻi Senate, replacing Shan Tsutsui who left the position to become Lieutenant Governor. Kim's tenure as President of the Senate ended in 2015.

In 2014, Kim ran for congress to fill the vacated seat of U.S. Rep. Colleen Hanabusa. She lost the race to Mark Takai.

In 2018, Kim once again ran for 1st Congressional District seat being vacated by Congresswoman Colleen Hanabusa, as she was running for governor, but lost to former congressman Ed Case.

Personal
Kim was born in Honolulu.

Her father is Korean, while her mother is Spanish-Filipino-Portuguese.

References

External links
 

American politicians of Filipino descent
Women state legislators in Hawaii
Hawaii politicians of Filipino descent
Democratic Party Hawaii state senators
Honolulu City Council members
Living people
Democratic Party members of the Hawaii House of Representatives
Presidents of the Hawaii Senate
Women city councillors in Hawaii
21st-century American politicians
21st-century American women politicians
1952 births
Candidates in the 2014 United States elections
Candidates in the 2018 United States elections
American politicians of Korean descent
American people of Spanish descent
American people of Portuguese descent
Asian-American city council members
Asian-American people in Hawaii politics